Haruchlora is a genus of butterflies belonging to the family Geometridae.

Species:
 Haruchlora maesi

Further reading
 Haruchlora maesi, a new emerald moth genus and species from Mesoamerica (Lepidoptera, Geometridae, Geometrinae) . Zootaxa 3869, 2. 30 Oct. 2014

References

Geometridae
Butterfly genera